Pronunciation is the way in which a word or a language is spoken.  This may refer to generally agreed-upon sequences of sounds used in speaking a given word or language in a specific dialect ("correct" or "standard" pronunciation) or simply the way a particular individual speaks a word or language. 

Contested or widely mispronounced words are typically verified by the sources from which they originate, such as names of cities and towns or the word GIF.  Words' pronunciations can be found in reference works such as dictionaries. General-purpose dictionaries typically only include standard pronunciations, but regional or dialectal pronunciations may be found in more specific works. Orthoepy means pronunciation considered correct, or the study thereof.

A word can be spoken in different ways by various individuals or groups, depending on many factors, such as: the duration of the cultural exposure of their childhood, the location of their current residence, speech or voice disorders, their ethnic group, their social class, or their education.

Linguistic terminology
Syllables are combinations of units of sound (phones), for example "goo" has one syllable made up of [g] and [u:]. The branch of linguistics which studies these units of sound is phonetics.  Phones which play the same role are grouped together into classes called phonemes; the study of these is phonemics or phonematics or phonology.  Phones as components of articulation are usually described using the International Phonetic Alphabet (IPA).

See also
 Elision
 Elocution
 Epenthesis
 Help:IPA/English — the principal key used in Wikipedia articles to transcribe the pronunciation of English words
 Help:Pronunciation respelling key — a secondary key for pronunciation which mimics English orthography
 Metathesis (linguistics)

References

External links 
 
 

Phonetics
Speech
Lexicology
Lexicography